Korona królów (The Crown of the Kings) is a Polish historical drama series. Aired from January 1, 2018, on TVP1. The show is a biographical story about the reign of: King Casimir III the Great (seasons 1–2), Queen Jadwiga and King Władysław II Jagiełło as co-rulers (season 3), and then Jagiełło as the sole ruler (season 4) of the Kingdom of Poland. The series tells the story of the monarchy in Poland in the 14th and 15th century.

Plot

Season 1 
The first season shows events from 1325 to 1339, showing the last years of King Władysław the Elbow-high's reign and the beginnings of the rule of Casimir the Great. It focuses on his first marriage with Queen Aldona Anna of Lithuania and relationship with mother - Queen Hedvig of Kalisz. Season ends in 1339, the year of death of Aldona and Hedvig.

Season 2 
The second season starts three years after events of first season's finale and shows events from years 1342–1370. It shows the threads of three castles:  Wawel, Visegrad and Świdnica. The story of King Casimir III the Great and his second wife Queen Adelaide of Hesse, is extended of threads of his sister - Elizabeth of Poland, Queen of Hungary, her son King Louis the Great and his nephew - Duke Bolko II the Small, his wife Agnes von Habsburg and niece Anna of Świdnica, future empress. Season shows also bigamic marriages of Casimir with Christina Rokiczana and Hedwig of Sagan, during Queen Adelaide's life. The action of the final episode takes place in 1374, four years after Casimir's death, when Jadwiga of Poland is born.

Season 3 
The third season shows the life of Saint Jadwiga of Poland and shows events from years 1376–1399. The action begins at the turn of 1376 and 1377 during the reign of Louis I of Hungary. The last years of his reign are shown, as well as the last moments of regency of his mother Queen Elizabeth in the Kingdom of Poland. The season explores the life and reign of Queen Jadwiga of Anjou, crowned King of Poland in 1384. One of the main threads is her relationship with Prince William Courteous of Austria and marriage with the Lithuanian Grand Duke Jogaiła. Season ends with death of Queen Jadwiga, three weeks after childbirth. In the final episode her and her baby daughter's funeral is shown.

Season 4

Series overview

Special episodes 
Korona królów: Od księcia do króla (The Crown of Kings: From Prince to King) is a special 25-minute episode of the series. He will explore the mystery of gaining power by Kazimierz. This episode is a summary of the events of the first series of the series - from the engagement of Kazimierz Anna to the moment of his mother's death Jadwiga. This episode will premiere on May 24, 2018 (Thursday), the day after the premiere of the first series issue.

Korona królów: Taka historia... (The Crown of Kings: Such a story ...) is a program that shows the story behind the creation of the series, as well as aimed at historical education. The premiere episodes are announced for Fridays at 18.30, starting from September 7, 2018, i.e. after the first week of the broadcast of the second season of the series

Characters and Cast

Main Cast 

 Mateusz Król (season 1) and Andrzej Hausner (season 2, guest season 3) as King Casimir III the Great
 Marta Bryła as Queen Aldona of Lithuania (season 1, guest season 2)
Halina Łabonarska as Queen Hedwig of Kalisz (season 1, guest seasons 2–3)
Katarzyna Czapla as Elizabeth of Poland, Queen of Hungary (seasons 1–3)
 Aleksandra Przesław as Queen Adelaide of Hesse (season 2)
 Dagmara Bryzek as Saint Queen Jadwiga of Poland (season 3, guest season 4)
 Vasyl Vasylyk (season 3) and Sebastian Skoczeń (season 4) as King Władysław II Jagiełło
 Milena Staszuk as Queen Anne of Cilli (season 4)

Royal Family

House of Piast 

Wiesław Wójcik as King Władysław I the Elbow-high (season 1, guest season 2)
 Anna Grycewicz as Princess Kunigunde, Duchess of Świdnica (season 1, guest season 2)
 Marta Wiśniewska as Princess Elizabeth (season 2)
 Julia Młynarczyk as toddler Princess Elizabeth (season 1)
 Gabriela Świerszczyńska as child Princess Elizabeth (season 1)
 Martyna Dudek as Princess Cunigunde (season 2)
 Wiktoria Zembrzycka as toddler Princess Cunigunde (season 1)
 Emilia Rostek as child Princess Cunigunde (season 1)
 Krzysztof Rogucki as Duke Casimir "Kaźko" IV of Pomerania (sason 2)
 Miłosz Kwiecień as child Duke Casimir "Kaźko" IV of Pomerania (season 2)
 Andrzej Popiel as Duke Bolko II the Small (seasons 1–2)
 Ewelina Pankowska as Princess Agnes of Austria, Duchess of Świdnica (seasons 1–2)
 Michał Wolny as Duke Henry II of Świdnica (season 2)
 Julia Gawrysiak as Empress Anna of Świdnica (season 2)
 Natalia Wolska as toddler Anna of Świdnica (season 2)
 Dorota Kuduk as Duchess Constance of Świdnica (season 1)
 Przemysław Furdak as Duke Henry V of Sagan (season 2)
 Aleksandra Nowosadko as Queen Hedwig of Sagan (season 2)
Zbigniew Suszyński as Duke Władysław of Opole (season 3)
Grażyna Szapołowska as Duchess Eufemia of Masovia (season 3)

House of Anjou 

 Jan Krzysztof Szczygieł as King Charles I Robert of Hungary (season 1)
 Kamil Siegmund as King Louis the Great (seasons 2–3)
 Jan Hrynkiewicz as young King Louis (season 2)
 Filip Dziwiszek as child Prince Louis (season 1)
 Filip Pilarski as child Prince Louis (season 2)
Małgorzata Buczkowska as Queen Elizabeth of Bosnia (season 3)
 Olga Madejska as Mary, Queen of Hungary (season 3)
Justyna Zielska as adolescent Mary (season 3)
Nadia Gałzińska as child Mary (season 3)
Antonina Litwiniak as Princess Catherine of Anjou (season 3)
 Bartłomiej Zieliński as Prince Andrew, Duke of Calabria (season 1)
 Filip Dziwiszek as Prince Stephen of Anjou (season 2)
 Wiktor Benicki as toddler Prince Stephen of Anjeou (season 1)

House of Habsburgs 

 Kacper Gaduła-Zawratyński as Duke William, Duke of Austria (season 3)
 Antoni Zakowicz as adolescent William (season 3)
Bruno Tomczyk as child William (season 3)
 Wojciech Niemczyk as Duke Leopold III, Duke of Austria (season 3)
 Patrycja Soliman as Duchess Viridis Visconti (season 3)

House of Gediminids 

 Bohdan Graczyk as Grand Duke of Lithuania, Giedyminas. (season 1)
 Wojciech Żołądkowicz as Duke Algirdas of Lithuania (seasons 1–3)
 Dorota Naruszewicz as Duchess Julianna of Tver, Grand Duchess of Lithuania (season 3)
 Jakub Mazurek as Duke Kęstutis of Luthuania (seasons 1–3)
Ihor Aronov (season 3) and Michał Chorosiński (season 4) as Duke Vytautas
Antoni Sałaj as Duke Skirgaila (season 3)
Emma Giegżno and Anya Zalevskaya as Princess Mary of Lithuania (season 3)
Agnieszka Wagner as Duchess Alexandra (season 4)
TBA as Vaidila (season 3)

House of Luxembourgs 

 Saniwoj Król as King John I of Bohemia (season 1) / King Charles IV, Holy Romany Emperor (season 2)
 Jan Marczewski as King Charles IV, Holy Romany Emperor (season 1)
Dominik Mirecki (season 3) and TBA (season 4) as King Sigismund of Luxembourg
Maksymilian Dobrowolski as adolescent Sigismund (season 3)

Castle officials, nobility and knights 
 Paulina Lasota as Cudka (seasons 1–2)
 Joanna Kwiatkowska-Zduń as Cudka (season 3)
 Marcelina Chlebna as child Cudka (season 1)
 Adrian Brząkała as Pełka, Cudka's Son (season 3)
Karol Czajkowski as Niemierza, Cudka's Son (season 3)
Michalina Sosna as Christine of Rokiczan (season 2)
Anna Terpiłowska as Estera, King Casimir the Great's lover (seasons 2–3)
 Sławomir Orzeszowski as Spycimir Leliwita, Castellan of Cracow (seasons 1–2)
 Tomasz Sapryk as Chancellor Zbigniew (seasons 1–2)
 Marcin Rogacewicz as Jaśko from Melsztyn, knight and Castellan of Cracow (seasons 1–3)
Aleksander Kaleta as Spytko II from Melsztyn, Castellan of Cracow (season 3)
 Robert Gonera as Bishop of Cracow, Jan Grot (seasons 1–2)
Artur Dziurman as Bishop of Cracow Jan Bodzęta (season 2)
Grzegorz Wons as Marcin from Rajsk (seasons 2–3).
 Agnieszka Mandat as Katarzyna Pilecka (seasons 1–2)
 Adam Bobik as Monk Wojciech, Queen Aldona and Adelaide's confessor (seasons 1–3)
 Wenanty Nosul as Eljasz, monk and medical (seasons 1–2)
 Violetta Arlak as Bożena Tęczyńska, Jan Grot's cousin (seasons 1–2)
 Andrzej Deskur as Archbishop of Gniezno Jarosław Bogoria (seasons 1–2)
 Krzysztof Wrona as Pełka from Sieciechowo, Castellan of Kalisz (seasons 1–2)
 Piotr Gawron-Jedlikowski as Niemierza from Gołcza (seasons 1–2)
 Marcin Rudziński as Archbishop of Gniezno Janisław (season 1)
 Piot Ligenza as Mikołaj Ligęza, cupbearer (seasons 1–2)
 Jacek Kopczyński as Grzegorz Nekanda (season 1)
 Miron Jagniewski as Paszek, Grot's secretary (seasons 1–2)
 Paulina Kondrak as Jagna (seasons 1–2)
Leszek Zdun as Janko from Czarnków (season 2)
Paweł Janyst as Janusz Suchywilk (seasons 2–3)
 Marianna Zydek as Małogorzata Tęczyńska (seasons 1–2)
 Jan Dravnel as Edmundas, Algirdas' knight (season 1)
 Sławomir Holland as Jan Ligęza, cupbearer (season 1)
 Jakub Mróz as Giovanni (season 1)
 Mateusz Kmiecik as Idzi, Cupbearer (seasons 1–2)
 Wiktoria Wolańska as Ofka, Jaśko from Melsztyn's wife (seasons 1–2)
 Izabela Noszczyk as Bogna, Ofka's aunt (seasons 1–2)
 Bartosz Adamczyk as Adam (season 2)
 Rafał Szałajko as Wacław from Balice (season 2)
 Bartłomiej Cabaj as Andrzej from Tęczyn (season 2)
 Maciej Robakiewicz as Adam from Książ (season 2)
 Maciej Grzybowski as Władysław from Wilhelmowo (season 2)
 Ziemowit Wasilewski as Cupbearer Zygfryd (season 2)
Zbigniew Dziduch as Beniamin from Kołdręb (season 2)
Wojciech Dmochowski as Błażej from Rajsk (season 2)
Paweł Caban as Michał from Czacz (season 2)
Łukasz Mazurek as Priest Marcin Baryczka (season 2)
Michał Lewandowski as Imperial Knight Hasso Wedel (season 2)
Jacek Ryś as Maciej Borkowic (season 2)
Arkadiusz Cyran as Bishop of Cracow Jan Radlica (season 3)
Piotr Dąbrowski as Archbishop of Gniezno Jan Bodzanta (season 3) 
Arkadiusz Detmer as Przedbor from Brzezie (season 3)
Andrzej Musiał as Sędziwój from Szubin (season 3)
Andrzej Mastalerz as Dymitr from Goraj (season 3)
Aleksandra Nieśpielak as Felicja (season 3)
Gabriela Całun as Jadwiga Pilecka from Melsztyn (season 3)
TBA as Jan from Tarnów (season 3)
Jakub Głukowski as Jan from Tęczyn (season 3)
Krzysztof Wach as Bishop of Cracow Piotr Wysz (season 3)

Castle servants 
 Małgorzata Kozłowska as Margit, Queen Jawiga's Maidservant (season 3)
Emma Herdzik as Queen Jadwiga's Maidservant Elizabeth Lackfi (season 3)
 Karina Seweryn as Egle, servant of Queen Aldona Anna. (seasons 1–2)
 Agata Bykowska as Gabija, Lithuanian cook (seasons 1–2)
 Karolina Kominek as Queen Adelaide's Maidservant Oda (season 2)
 Hanna Wojak as Queen Adelaide's Maidservant Jutta (season 2)
Zofia Schwinke as Queen Elizabeth's Maidservant Ilona (seasons 2–3)
 Paulina Masiak as Duchess Agnes' Maidervant Ilza (season 2)
 Ilona Korycka as Maidserwant Halszka (season 1)
 Dagmara Bąk as Maiderwant Helena, served Queen Anna, then Duchess Agnieszka. (seasons 1–2)
Kinga Jasik as Helena Reibnitz (season 3)
Magda Groszek as child Helena (season 2)
 Aleksandra Ciejek as Maidservant Manita (season 2)
 Helena Chorzelska as Servant Weronika (season 2)
 Beata Chyczewska as Queen Elizabeth's Maidservant Klara Pukar (seasons 2-2)
 Monika Domowicz as Queen Elizabeth's Maidservant Anda (seasons 1–3)
 Dagmara Brodziak as Servant Femka (seasons 1–2)
 Renata Berger as Maidserwent Stanisława (season 1)
 Dominika Kryszczńska as Machna (season 1)
 Mirosław Kupiec as Magister Cuinae (season 1)
 Gabriela Chojecka as Egle's daughter Audre (seasons 1–2)
 Grzegorz Woś as Servant Śmil (seasons 1–2)
 Mirosław Jękot as Chef (seasons 1–2)
 Grzegorz Kowalczyk as Groom Rafał (seasons 1–2)
 Ryszard Jabłoński as Kitchen Boy Grzymek (seasons 2–3)
 Marcin Bubółka as Chitchen Boy Miłek (seasons 1–2)

Other characters 
 Dorota Chotecka-Pazura as Regina (season 2)
TBA as Urszula (season 3)
 Karolina Piechota as Vendor Rozalia (season 1)
 Bartłomiej Nowosielski as Józef (season 1)
 Maurycy Popiel as Arunas Szymon (season 1)
 Zbigniew Waleryś as Innkeeper (seasons 1–2)
Izabela Bujniewicz as Lenka (season 2)
 Aleksandra Grzelak as Barbara Dunin (season 1)
Karolina Porcari as Bella (season 2)
Natalia Lesz as Ragana (season 3)
 Jasper Sołtysiewicz as Gedko (season 1)
 Karol Zakrzewski as Witautas, Lithuanian trader (seasons 1–2)
Mateusz Burdach as Bogdan (season 2)
 Jan Cięciara as Young Bogdan (season 1)
 Ludmiła Warzecha as Old lady (season 1)
 Maciej Mikołajczyk as Stasiek from Wierzbin (seasons 1–2)
 Wojciech Starostecki as Trader Jarzynka (seasons 1–2)
 Dominik Bąk as Mszczuj (season 1)
 Jerzy Mazur as Maidservant Helena's father Przybysław (season 2)
Paweł Tucholski as Guillaume de Machaut (season 2)
Marek Prażnowski as Wierzynek (season 2)
Kiril Denev as Eutryfon (season 2)
Karol Drozd as Jan from Sącz (season 2)
Marcin Kiszluk as King Peter I of Cyprus (season 2)

References 

2010s Polish television series
2020s Polish television series
2018 Polish television series debuts
Historical television series
Television series set in the 14th century
Television series set in the 15th century
Television series set in the Middle Ages
Television series about history of Poland